This is a list of films which have placed number one at the weekend box office in the United States during 1992.

Number-one films

Highest-grossing films

Calendar Gross
Highest-grossing films of 1992 by Calendar Gross

In-Year Release

See also
 Lists of American films — American films by year
 Lists of box office number-one films

References

Chronology

1992
United States
1992 in American cinema
1992-related lists